The 1996 Southeastern Conference baseball tournament was the 1996 postseason baseball championship of the NCAA Division I Southeastern Conference, held at Hoover Metropolitan Stadium in Hoover, Alabama from May 15 through 19.  Alabama defeated Florida in the championship game, earning the conference's automatic bid to the 1996 NCAA Division I baseball tournament.

Format
Eight teams qualified for the league tournament.  The teams seeded fifth through eighth played a single-elimination play-in round.  The two winners of the play-in games advanced to the main bracket, which was a six-team, double-elimination format, the same as the NCAA regional format used through 1998.

Regular season results

Tournament

Play-in games

Main bracket

All-tournament team

See also
College World Series
NCAA Division I Baseball Championship
Southeastern Conference baseball tournament

References

Tournament
Southeastern Conference Baseball Tournament
Southeastern Conference baseball tournament
Southeastern Conference baseball tournament
College sports tournaments in Alabama
Baseball competitions in Hoover, Alabama